Kenneth McLeod Duncan,  (born 20 December 1954) is an Australian photographer. He is regarded as one of Australia's most acclaimed landscape photographers, and gained prominence for his pioneering work with panoramic landscapes and limited edition photographic prints.

Early years 
Ken Duncan was born in Mildura, Victoria, on Australia's Murray River, and lived most of his early life in country towns. He became interested in photography in his early teens. After leaving school, he eventually became senior technical representative for Australia's leading photographic supply house. His particular interest with panoramic shots began when the company imported the Widelux camera, which had the ability to produce panoramic shots of his favourite landscapes. In 1981, at the age of 26, he moved to Sydney.

Career 
In 1982, he left Sydney to travel around Australia and to photograph its famed landscapes. In five years he produced more than 80,000 images.

Although the panoramic format is considered his most popular, Ken Duncan has also used many other different formats and media. He has produced several books and has been awarded for his work. His first major publication was a pictorial book called The Last Frontier — Australia Wide published in 1987 by Weldon publishers. More than 65,000 copies have been sold.

In 2001, he published a book called America Wide: In God We Trust, which features landscapes of 50 U.S. states. It was completed a few days before the September 11 attacks in 2001. He published a sequel, Spirit of America, in 2006. In 2003, Ken Duncan released 3D Australia — popularising 3D printing.

In the 2009 Australia Day Honours, Duncan was awarded a Medal of the Order of Australia (OAM) by the Australian Government for his services to the arts as a landscape photographer and publisher, and for his service to the Central Coast community.

Beliefs 
Ken Duncan is a Christian and a creationist.

Notes

References

External links
 KenDuncan.com

1954 births
Australian photographers
Australian Presbyterians
ARIA Award winners
Living people
Recipients of the Medal of the Order of Australia